Krzyż railway station is a railway station serving the town of Krzyż Wielkopolski, in the Greater Poland Voivodeship, Poland. The station opened in 1851 and is located on the Tczew–Kostrzyn railway, Poznań–Szczecin railway and now closed Wałcz–Krzyż railway. The train services are operated by PKP, Przewozy Regionalne.

Despite Krzyż being a small town, its station has an important interchange function between the north–south route from Szczecin to Poznan and the east–west route from Germany and Gorzów Wielkopolski to Piła and further east.

The station building is located on the central platform and is connected to the town by a footbridge. At the station there is also a large depot of Przewozy Regionalne, including a working turntable and Roundhouse.

Train services
The station is served by the following services:

Express Intercity services (EIC) Szczecin — Warsaw 
Intercity services Swinoujscie - Szczecin - Stargard - Krzyz - Poznan - Kutno - Warsaw - Bialystok / Lublin - Rzeszow - Przemysl
Intercity services Swinoujscie - Szczecin - Stargard - Krzyz - Poznan - Leszno - Wroclaw - Opole - Katowice - Krakow - Rzeszow - Przemysl
Intercity services Szczecin - Stargard - Krzyz - Poznan - Kutno - Lowicz - Lodz - Krakow
Intercity services Szczecin - Stargard - Krzyz - Pila - Bydgoszcz - Torun - Kutno - Lowicz - Warsaw - Lublin - Rzeszow - Przemysl
Intercity services Gorzow Wielkopolski - Krzyz - Pila - Bydgoszcz - Torun - Kutno - Lowicz - Warsaw
Intercity services Gorzow Wielkopolski - Krzyz - Poznan - Ostrow Wielkopolski - Lubliniec - Czestochowa - Krakow
Intercity services (TLK) Gdynia Główna — Kostrzyn 
Regional services (R) Szczecin - Stargard - Dobiegniew - Krzyz - Wronki - Poznan
Regional services (R) Kostrzyn - Gorzow Wielkopolski - Krzyz
Regional services (R) Krzyz - Pila - Chojnice

Preserved locomotive
Steam Engine Ol49-82 is plinthed at the station.

References

 This article is based upon a translation of the Polish language version as of October 2016.

Railway stations in Poland opened in 1851
Railway stations in Greater Poland Voivodeship
Czarnków-Trzcianka County
19th-century establishments in the Province of Posen